The Nordic Cup is a darts tournament that has been held since 1975. It is the Nordic Championships, and the winners are Nordic Champions.

It is an invitational, the participating countries are: Norway, Finland, Sweden, Denmark and Iceland. Teams consist of 8 men (2 teams of 4 players, A and B teams) & 4 woman players (1 team).

Matches are played as Men's Team Event, Men's Pairs & Men's Singles - Ladies Team event, Ladies Pairs & Ladies Singles. Points are awarded to each nation depending on individual and team performances, with overall gold going to the nation with most points.

From 1976 till 1996 it was played every year. From 1996 and till today it is only played every second year

Men

Men's Singles

Men's Pairs

Men's Team

Men's Overall

Ladies

Ladies Single

Ladies Pairs

Ladies Team

Ladies Overall

External links
Stream from the 2010 Nordic Invitational finals
Norwegian Darts Organisation, results under "Landslaget"
Swedish Wikipedia site with Swedish results

Darts tournaments
Recurring sporting events established in 1980
Inter-Nordic sports competitions
1980 establishments in Europe